Dushkin (Russian: Душкин) is a Russian masculine surname, its feminine countrerpart is Dushkina. The surname may refer to
 Alexey Dushkin (1904–1977), Soviet architect
 Leonid Dushkin (1910–1990), Soviet rocket scientist
 Dushkin S-155, rocket motor designed by Leonid Dushkin
 Samuel Dushkin (1891–1976), American violinist and composer

Russian-language surnames